Trevor Smith (born 20 December 1959) is an Irish equestrian. He competed in the individual eventing at the 2000 Summer Olympics.

References

External links
 

1959 births
Living people
Irish male equestrians
Olympic equestrians of Ireland
Equestrians at the 2000 Summer Olympics
People from Tandragee